Mayfair Girl is a 1933 British crime film directed by George King and starring Sally Blane, John Stuart and Glen Alyn. A quota quickie, it was made at Teddington Studios by the British subsidiary of Warner Bros.

Cast
 Sally Blane as Brenda Mason  
 John Stuart as Robert Blair  
 D. A. Clarke-Smith as Captain Merrow  
 Glen Alyn as Santa  
 Roland Culver as Dick Porter  
 James Carew 
 Philip Strange 
 Charles Hawtrey 
 Anna Lee

References

Bibliography
 Chibnall, Steve. Quota Quickies: The Birth of the British 'B' Film. British Film Institute, 2007.
 Low, Rachael. Filmmaking in 1930s Britain. George Allen & Unwin, 1985.
 Wood, Linda. British Films, 1927-1939. British Film Institute, 1986.

External links

1933 films
Films directed by George King
1933 crime films
British crime films
Films shot at Teddington Studios
Warner Bros. films
Films set in London
British black-and-white films
1930s English-language films
1930s British films
Quota quickies